Et Cetera ( or (proscribed)), abbreviated to etc., etc, et cet., &c. or &c is a Latin expression that is used in English to mean "and other similar things", or "and so forth". Translated literally from Latin,  means 'and', while  means 'the rest'; thus the expression translates to 'and the rest (of such things)'. 

Et Cetéra is a calque of the Koine Greek  meaning 'and the other things'.

Spellings and usage
The one-word spelling "etcetera" appears in some dictionaries. The abbreviated form &c. or &c is still occasionally used (the ampersand character, &, derives from a ligature of ).

The phrase et cetera is often used to denote the logical continuation of some sort of series of descriptions.  For example, in the following expression:

We will need a lot of bread: wheat, granary, wholemeal, etc. on our menu. 

In this case of a use at the end of a list without conjunction, a comma is typically written in front of the phrase (but see: Serial comma). If etc. is used at the end of a sentence, the dot is not doubled. If it occurs at the end of exclamations, questions or a clause, the dot is not suppressed but followed by whatever punctuation marks are required to end or continue the sentence.

In blackletter (Gothic or Fraktur) typography, the "r rotunda" (ꝛ) is sometimes used for et in place of the similar-looking Tironian et (⁊), followed by c, to yield ꝛc.

Similar Latin expressions
 In lists of people, et alia (abbreviated as et al., meaning "and others") is used in place of etc.
 In lists of places, et alibi may be used, which is also abbreviated et al.; et alibi means "and elsewhere".
 In references to literature or texts in general, et sequentes (versus) or et sequentia 'and the words etc. following' (abbreviated et seq., plural et seqq.) are used to indicate that only the first portion of a known reference is given explicitly, with broad reference to the following passages which logically follow in sequence to the explicit reference. Hence "Title VII, Section 4, Subsection A, Paragraph 1, et seq." might refer to many subsections or paragraphs which follow Paragraph 1. Legal briefs and legislative documents make heavy use of et seq. Notice that there is a functional difference between et seq. and etc. Et seq. and its variations refer specifically to known text; etc. may do so too, but is more likely to leave the reader to supply the unspecified items for himself. It would not be helpful to say: "Various paragraphs of import similar to those in Title VII, Sections 4, 7, and 2 et seq." though it might make sense to use etc. in such a context.

In popular culture
In the 1956 film The King and I, Yul Brynner repeatedly used the expression "...et cetera, et cetera, et cetera..." in his portrayal of King Mongkut of Siam, to characterize the king as wanting to impress everyone with his breadth of great knowledge and the importance of one with no need to expound.  This reflected the usage in the novel, Anna and the King of Siam, which expressed that king's playful understanding of innumerable things with the phrase, "&c., &c."

Other uses
"Et cetera" and derivatives, such as "etceteras", have long been, and still are, used airily, humorously or dismissively, often as a cadigan, for example:

 ... he still wanted numberless appendages to make him a fine gentleman, such as a fashionable tailor and hairdresser, an unblushing confidence, together with a long train of etceteras. These fashionable introductories being wanting, Mr Whitmore was obliged to find a substitute... (1823)
 The cost of the locomotives and their etceteras, is to be $136000 – their wear and tear $75600. Etceteras $90000... (1834)
 The etceteras: asteroids, comets and interplanetary dust are chemically speaking, "impurities" and are just a minuscule fraction of planetary matter. (1989)
 Having tried "to recover myth outside the books," the hidalgo crosses paths with common sense, everyday toils, and the religious dictates of the Counter-Reformation on a journey that tries to rescue chivalric etceteras of old. (2008)
 /etc, a directory (aka "folder") in UNIX-like operating systems, responsible mainly for storing system-wide configuration files, preferences, etc.

In other languages
(abbreviation: ens.)
Albanian:  (abbr.: etj.)
Arabic: إلى آخره، إلخ
Armenian: և այլն
Basque: eta abar (abbr.: etab.)
Bengali: ইত্যাদি or প্রভৃতি is used for et cetera while "প্রমুখ" is used for et alii
Bulgarian: и така нататък (abbr.: и т.н.) (i taka natatŭk)
Catalan: etcètera (abbr.: etc.)
Chinese: 等 (děng) or "等等" (děngděng)
Czech: a tak dále (abbr.: atd.)
Danish: og så videre (abbr.: osv.)
Dutch: enzovoort or enzovoorts (abbr.: enz.)
Dzongkha: ༴ (repetition sign)
Esperanto: kaj tiel plu (abbr.: ktp.)
Estonian: ja nii edasi (abbr.: jne)
Faroese: og so framvegis (abbr.: osfr. or o.s.fr.)
Finnish: ja niin edelleen (abbr.: jne.) or "ynnä muuta sellaista" (abbr.: yms.)
French: et cetera, et cætera, or et caetera (abbr.: etc.)
Galician: e o demais, or etcétera (abbr. etc.)
Georgian: და ასე შემდეგ (rom.: da ase shemdeg) (abbr.: და ა.შ.)
Greek: και τα λοιπά (ke ta lipá, abbr.: κτλ.)
Gujarati: વગેરે (vagere)
Ancient Greek: καὶ τὰ ἕτερα (ke ta étera)
Hindi: इत्यादि (ityadi) or वगैरा (vagaira)
Hungarian: és a többi (abbr.: stb.), és így tovább; etc. is in regular use, too
Icelandic: og svo framvegis (abbr.: o.s.frv.)
Indonesian: dan lain-lain (abbr.: dll.), dan sebagainya (used for similar things; abbr.: dsb.), dan seterusnya (used for sequences; abbr.: dst.)
Irish:  (abbr.: srl./⁊rl)
isiXhosa: njalo-njalo
Italian: eccetera,  (abbr.: ecc. or etc.)
Japanese: "その他" (sono ta, sono hoka), or suffix "等" (tō, nado) or "など" (nado), "エトセトラ/えとせとら" (etosetora)
Kannada: "ಇತರೆ" or "ಇತ್ಯಾದಿ"
Korean: "등/等"() or "기타/其他"
Kyrgyz: жана башкалар (abbr.: ж.б.), дагы ушул сыяктуулар (abbr.: д.у.с.)
Lao: ຯລຯ (read as ແລະອຶ່ນໆ lɛ-ɯːn-ɯːn)
Latvian: un tā tālāk (abbr.: utt.)
Lithuanian: ir taip toliau (abbr.: ir t.t.)
Macedonian: и така натаму (abbr.: итн.)
Malagasy: sy ny sisa (abbr.: sns.)
Malayalam: തുടങ്ങിയവ (pronounced thudangiyava)
Maltese: eċċetera (abbr.: eċċ.)
Marathi: इत्यादी (pron. ityadi)
Mongolian: гэх мэт (abbr.: г.м.)
Nepali language: आदि, इत्यादि (aadi, ityaadi)
Norwegian (bokmål): og så videre (abbr.: osv.)
Norwegian (nynorsk): og så bortetter (abbr.: osb.) or og så vidare (osv.)
Odia: ଇତ୍ୟାଦି (ityaadi)
Persian: وغیره
Polish: i tak dalej (abbr.: itd.)
Portuguese: et cetera (abbr.: etc.)
Punjabi: ਆਦਿਕ (pron. aadik) and ਆਦਿ (pron. aadi)
Romanian: și așa mai departe (abbr.: ș.a.m.d.), or și celelalte (abbr.: ș.cl.); the latter somewhat obsolete
Russian: и так далее (rom.: i tak daleje) (abbr.: и т.д.), or и тому подобное (rom.: i tomu podobnoje) (abbr.: и т.п.) 
Sanskrit: इत्यादिः (ityaadih)
Serbo-Croatian: i tako dalje / и тако даље (abbr.: itd. / итд.)
Sesotho: jwalo-jwalo (abbr.: j.j.)
Slovak: a tak ďalej (abbr.: atď.)
Slovenian: in tako dalje (abbr.: itd.)
Sorani:هەتادوایی،هتد (hata dwayy, abbr.: htd)
Somali:Iyo wixii lamida (abbr.:IWM)
Spanish: etcétera (abbr.: etc.)
Swahili: na kadhalika (abbr.: n.k.)
Swedish: och så vidare (abbr.: o.s.v.)
Tagalog: at iba pa (abbr: atbp.)
Tamil: இன்ன பிற (pron. iṉṉa piṟa), முதலியன (pron. muthaliyaṉa)
Telugu: "ఇతర", "ఇత్యాది", "మొదలగునవి" or "మొదలైనవి", "వగైరా"(pronounced as "ithara", "ithyaadhi", "modalagunavi" or "modhalainavi", "vagairaa")
Thai: ฯลฯ (This three-letter combination is not an abbreviation but a sign called ไปยาลใหญ่ "paiyan yai". It is to be read และอื่นๆ "lae uen uen", or และอื่นๆ อีกมากมาย "lae uen uen ik mak mai", meaning "and others" or "and many others", respectively.)
Turkish: ve benzerleri (abbr.: vb.) or vesaire (abbr.: vs.)
Turkmen: we şuňa meňzeşler (abbr.: we ş.m.)
Ukrainian: тощо (toshcho)
Urdu: وغیرہ وغیرہ (vagherah vagherah)
Uyghur: قاتارلىق 
Vietnamese: vân vân (abbr.: v.v.)
Welsh: ac yn y blaen (abbr.: ayyb)
Yiddish: און אזוי ווייטער (rom. un azoy vayter)

See also
Ellipses (...) may be used for a similar function
List of Latin phrases

References

External links

 I.E., ETC., et al AND E.G. –Comparison, Difference
 ईटीसी का अर्थ (ETC Full form)

Latin words and phrases